Il comune senso del pudore is a 1976 Italian comedy film. It stars Alberto Sordi, which is also the director,  Claudia Cardinale and Philippe Noiret.

Plot
The film consists of four episodes. The plot centers on the changes in morality that involved Italian society in the 1970s, mainly focusing on the widespread circulation of erotic movies and magazines.

First episode
A mature worker, Giacinto, decides to celebrate his silver wedding anniversary bringing his wife Erminia to the cinema after a long time. Wandering around Rome, they innocently fall into a number of erotic movies. The couple is initially shocked, but soon start to be somehow fascinated by the sexual content.

Second episode
Ottavio Caramessa, a small-town teacher and writer, is hired as a director by a pornographic magazine, jumping suddenly from rags to riches with the help of his extrovert typist, Loredana. He is soon arrested but has no regrets, being certain to fight a noble fight against obscurantism.

Third episode
Tiziano Ballarin, the local magistrate of a small town in Veneto, takes strict measures against adult magazines. While the village is excited by his moralistic - and in some cases hypocritical - campaign, Tiziano's wife, Armida, becomes the target of one of the magazines her husband harshly fights.

Fourth episode
The award-winning German actress Ingrid Streissberg refuses to shoot a sodomy scene in a film adaptation of Lady Chatterley's Lover, produced by the hot tempered Giuseppe Costanzo (somewhat inspired by Dino De Laurentiis). Having invested a great amount of money, he tries everything to convince the star, and even hires a "group of experts" - among which a self-styled progressive priest - to assert the considerable social and cultural relevance of the scene.

Epilogue
The day of the premiere, all the characters express their favorable opinion about the movie.

Cast
Alberto Sordi: Giacinto Colonna
Cochi Ponzoni: Ottavio Caramessa
Florinda Bolkan: Loredana Davoli
Claudia Cardinale:	Armida Ballarin
Philippe Noiret: Giuseppe Costanzo
Rossana Di Lorenzo: Erminia Colonna
Silvia Dionisio: Orchidea
Giò Stajano: Fashion photographer
Renzo Marignano: Director of  Lady Chatterley '76
Dagmar Lassander: Ingrid Streesberg
Pino Colizzi: Tiziano Ballarin 
Ugo Gregoretti: Critic
Marina Cicogna: an advisor
Armando Brancia: film distributor
Gisela Hahn: Ursula Kerr 
Manfred Freyberger: Ingrid's husband  
David Warbeck: Mellors  
Franca Scagnetti: Restaurant waitress
Jimmy il Fenomeno: Himself
Macha Magall: the countess

See also 
 
 List of Italian films of 1976

References

External links

1976 films
1970s Italian-language films
Commedia all'italiana
Films about pornography
Films directed by Alberto Sordi
Films scored by Piero Piccioni
Films set in Rome
Films set in Italy
1976 comedy films
1970s Italian films